is a Japanese actor, kabuki actor, and the leading bassist of buyō Bandō-ryū. He is the current and second holder of the Kabuki name "Bandō Minosuke". Yamatoya is his yagō and Mitsudai is his family crest. He is represented by the Horipro Booking Agency.

Early life
Bandō is the eldest son of Bandō Mitsugorō X and Hizuru Kotobuki and grandson of Bandō Mitsugorō IX.

From April 2006, he formed an amateur band called Zero click with his real name Mitsuhisa Morita. Bandō was in charge of drums, but since March 2007, he ceased activities for members to take the university entrance exam. He also have a band called KBK 48 with Yakusha and Tokoyama. Bandō has a drum set, ten guitars, etc. at his home.

According to his father Mitsugorō, from the severity of the family environment and practice, Minosuke said that there was a time when he was troubled becoming an actor, but now he is determined to make a move to a kabuki way.

Bandō dropped out from Horikoshi High School.

Career
In September 1991 the Kabuki-za "Bandō Mitsugorō VIII Jū Nana-kai-ki Tsuizen" , made his first visit.
In November 1995 It is a small monkey of Shiba-za of Kabuki-za Yamato Kana Zai-gyō Keizu and  probably the name of Bandō Minosuke as a proponent.

Filmography

Kabuki

TV dramas

Variety, cultural

Films

References

External links
 
 
 
 – Blog 
Kabuki Haiyū Meikan Genzai no Haiyū-hen "Bandō Minosuke II" – Kabuki on the web 
Kabuki Bito "Gei no Manazashi, Yū no Sugao Dai Rokkai" – Interview 

Kabuki actors
Japanese male actors
Horipro artists
People from Tokyo
1989 births
Living people
Horikoshi High School alumni
Male actors from Tokyo